Peter de Almeida (born June 28, 1983 in Taboão da Serra) is a Brazilian footballer, who currently plays for Clube Atlético Metropolitano.

Honours
Paraná State League: 2006

References

External links
 Profile on zerozero.pt

1983 births
Living people
Brazilian footballers
Associação Desportiva São Caetano players
Associação Portuguesa de Desportos players
U.D. Leiria players
Marília Atlético Clube players
América Futebol Clube (RN) players
Paraná Clube players
Mirassol Futebol Clube players
Figueirense FC players
Brazilian expatriates in Portugal
Grêmio Foot-Ball Porto Alegrense players
Criciúma Esporte Clube players
Association football midfielders
Sport Club do Recife players
People from Taboão da Serra